Conspiracy Theory is a 1997 American political action thriller film directed by Richard Donner. Starring Mel Gibson, Julia Roberts and Patrick Stewart, the original screenplay by Brian Helgeland centers on an eccentric taxi driver who believes many world events are triggered by government conspiracies, and the Justice Department attorney who becomes involved in his life. The film was a financial success, but critical reviews were mixed.

Plot
Conspiracy-theorist and New York City taxi driver Jerry Fletcher continually expounds his ideas to Alice Sutton, a lawyer at the Justice Department. She humors him because he once saved her from a mugging, but is unaware he spies on her at her home. Her own work is to solve the mystery of her father's murder. Seeing suspicious activity everywhere, Jerry identifies some men as CIA workers, follows them into a building, and is captured. The interrogator injects Jerry with LSD and questions him using torture. Jerry experiences terrifying hallucinations and flashbacks, panics, and manages to escape by incapacitating the interrogator by biting his nose and kicking him.

Later, after being captured again, Jerry is handcuffed to a hospital bed and forced into a drug-induced sleep. Alice visits, and Jerry persuades her to switch his chart with the criminal in the next bed or he will be dead by morning. When Alice returns the next day, the criminal is dead, allegedly from a heart attack. The CIA, FBI and other agencies are there, led by CIA psychiatrist Dr. Jonas, whose nose is bandaged. Meanwhile, Jerry fakes a heart attack and, with Alice's help, escapes again and later hides in Alice's car. While Alice and FBI Agent Lowry are examining Jerry's personal items, the CIA arrive and confiscate everything. She declines Lowry's offer to work with her, and later finds Jerry hiding in her car. They leave the hospital and, on the way to Jerry's apartment, Jerry explains someone is likely following her. Trying to avoid a car chase, Alice switches lanes and stops, finding out that that someone is Lowry, she convinces him to leave her until she has more information to give him and he drives away. They go inside Jerry's well secured apartment, where he tells her about the conspiracy newsletter he produces.

Just when Alice has decided Jerry is crazy, a SWAT team breaks in. Jerry sets everything on fire and they leave through his elaborate secret trapdoor exit. In the room below, there is a large mural on the wall, which features both Alice on her horse and the triple smokestacks of the Ravenswood Generating Station. As Jerry's apartment is burning, Jerry and Alice escape, with Jerry disguised as a firefighter to avoid suspicion. The pair go to her apartment, where Jerry accidentally reveals he had been watching her. Upon hearing this, Alice kicks him out of her apartment. On the street below, Jerry confronts Lowry and his partner staking out her place, and he warns them at gunpoint not to hurt her. After being tracked to a bookstore, Jerry sees operatives rappelling down from black helicopters and hides in a theater, escaping by causing a panic by saying "Bomb!"

Alice calls each person on Jerry's newsletter mailing list and finds that all have recently died, except one. Jerry uses a ruse to get her out of the office, and then immobilizes the operatives watching her. During their escape, he tells her that he fell in love with her at first sight, then flees on a subway train when she brushes off his feelings. She goes to see the last surviving person on the subscription list, and finds that it is Jonas. He tells her that Jerry was brainwashed using techniques developed by Dr. Jonas at Project MKUltra to become an assassin and was stolen by another party, which only Jerry can identify. He also claims that Jerry killed her father. She agrees to help find Jerry, who sends her a message to meet him. He ditches the agents following them with a pre-arranged car transfer, and he drives her to her father's private horse stables in Connecticut. Meanwhile, Alice secretly calls her office so that Jonas can track her phone. At the stables, Jerry remembers that he was sent to kill her father, but found that he could not and had become his friend instead. Jerry tells Alice that he had promised to watch over her before the judge was killed by another assassin. Jonas' men capture Jerry, kill her hierarchical superior and attempt to kill or capture her without success.

Having escaped, Alice brings Lowry to the offices where she met Jonas, which they find cleared out. She then forces him at gunpoint to admit that he is not from the FBI, but from a "secret agency that watches the other agencies". He says that they have been using the unwitting Jerry to uncover and stop Jonas. Alice goes to the site of the Ravenswood Generating Station smokestacks from Jerry's mural and sees a mental hospital next door. There she hears and talks to Jerry through a vent, and an attendant she had bribed shows her to an unused wing. She breaks in and finds Jerry. As Jonas catches them, Lowry arrives with his men and attacks Jonas' men. Jerry attempts to drown Jonas, but is shot by Jonas from underwater. Alice, who has regained consciousness after being knocked out, then shoots Jonas eleven times. After killing Jonas, Alice tells Jerry that she loves him before he is taken away in an ambulance. Some time later, a grieving Alice visits Jerry's grave and leaves a pin that he had given her. She returns to riding her horse that she had stopped riding after her father's murder. While watching Alice from a car with Lowry, Jerry keeps to his agreement to not contact her until all of Jonas' other subjects are caught. As they drive away singing "Can't Take My Eyes Off You", Alice finds the pin she had left at Jerry's "grave" attached to her saddle, and smiles as she continues riding.

Cast
 Mel Gibson as Jerry Fletcher
 Julia Roberts as Alice Sutton
 Patrick Stewart as Dr. Jonas
 Cylk Cozart as Agent Lowry
 Steve Kahan as Mr. Wilson
 Terry Alexander as Flip
 Pete Koch as Fire Captain
 Dean Winters as Cleet
 Alex McArthur as Cynic
 Kenneth Tigar as Lawyer
 Sean Patrick Thomas as Surveillance Operator
 Joan Lunden as TV Announcer

Richard Donner made cameo as Jerry's cab passenger.

Production
All scenes filmed at the horse farm used Lionshare Farm in Greenwich, Connecticut. That facility is owned by United States Equestrian Team member Peter Leone—who coached Julia Roberts through the scene at movie's end, where she gallops her horse across a field while Gibson's character looks on longingly from a vehicle driving on a nearby road.

Reception

Box office
 
Conspiracy Theory was released August 8, 1997, to 2,806 theaters, and had an opening weekend gross of $19,313,566 in the United States. The film opened at number 1 in the U.S., displacing Air Force One. The film eventually grossed $75,982,834 in the U.S. and $61,000,000 internationally, for a worldwide total of $136,982,834. This final gross made Conspiracy Theory the 19th highest-grossing film in the U.S. in 1997.

Critical response
 
Review aggregation website Rotten Tomatoes gives the film a score of 57% based on reviews from 44 critics. Audiences polled by CinemaScore gave the film an average grade of "B+" on an A+ to F scale.

In her review in The New York Times, Janet Maslin said, "The only sneaky scheme at work here is the one that inflates a hollow plot to fill 2¼ hours while banishing skepticism with endless close-ups of big, beautiful movie-star eyes ... Gibson, delivering one of the hearty, dynamic star turns that have made him the Peter Pan of the blockbuster set, makes Jerry much more boyishly likable than he deserves to be. The man who talks to himself and mails long, delusional screeds to strangers is not usually the dreamboat type ... After the story enjoys creating real intrigue  ... it becomes tied up in knots. As with too many high-concept escapades, Conspiracy Theory tacks on a final half-hour of hasty explanations and mock-sincere emotion. The last scene is an outright insult to anyone who took the movie seriously at its start."

Lisa Schwarzbaum of Entertainment Weekly graded the film B− and commented, "Richard Donner ... switches the movie from a really interesting, jittery, literate, and witty tone poem about justified contemporary paranoia (and the creatively unhinged dark side of New York City) to an overloaded, meandering iteration of a Lethal Weapon project that bears the not-so-secret stamp of audience testing and tinkering."

In the San Francisco Chronicle, Mick LaSalle stated, "If I were paranoid I might suspect a conspiracy at work in the promoting of this movie—to suck in audiences with a catchy hook and then give them something much more clumsy and pedestrian ... Conspiracy Theory can be enjoyed once one gives up hope of its becoming a thinking person's thriller and accepts it as just another diversion ... When all else fails, there are still the stars to look at—Roberts, who actually manages to do some fine acting, and Gibson, whose likability must be a sturdy thing indeed."

Roger Ebert of the Chicago Sun-Times observed the film "cries out to be a small film—a quixotic little indie production where the daffy dialogue and weird characters could weave their coils of paranoia into great offbeat humor. Unfortunately, the parts of the movie that are truly good are buried beneath the deadening layers of thriller cliches and an unconvincing love story ... If the movie had stayed at ground level—had been a real story about real people—it might have been a lot better, and funnier. All of the energy is in the basic material, and none of it is in a romance that is grafted on like an unneeded limb or superfluous organ."

In Rolling Stone, Peter Travers said, "The strong impact that Gibson makes as damaged goods is diluted by selling Jerry as cute and redeemable. Instead of a scalding brew of mirth and malice, served black, Donner settles up a tepid latte, decaf. What a shame—Conspiracy Theory could have been a contender."

Todd McCarthy of Variety called the film "a sporadically amusing but listless thriller that wears its humorous, romantic and political components like mismatched articles of clothing ... This is a film in which all things ... are treated lightly, even glibly ... One can readily sympathize with ... the director's desire to inject the picture with as much humor as possible. But he tries to have it every which way in the end, and the conflicting moods and intentions never mesh comfortably."

Pauline Kael in an interview said "the first half of Conspiracy Theory was terrific, then it went to hell" but that Mel Gibson was "stunningly good."
  
In his 2003 book A Culture of Conspiracy, political scientist Michael Barkun notes that a vast popular audience has been introduced by the film to the notion that the U.S. government is controlled by a deep state whose secret agents use black helicopters — a view once confined to the radical right.

References

External links
 
 

1997 films
1997 action thriller films
1997 crime drama films
American action thriller films
American crime drama films
American chase films
American detective films
1990s English-language films
Techno-thriller films
Fictional portrayals of schizophrenia
Films scored by Carter Burwell
Films about conspiracy theories
Films about psychiatry
Films about the Central Intelligence Agency
Films directed by Richard Donner
Films produced by Joel Silver
Films with screenplays by Brian Helgeland
Films set in New York City
Films shot in New York City
Medical-themed films
Silver Pictures films
Warner Bros. films
American political thriller films
1997 drama films
1990s American films